First-seeded Margaret Smith defeated unseeded Billie Jean Moffitt in the final, 6–3, 6–4 to win the ladies' singles tennis title at the 1963 Wimbledon Championships and completed the career grand slam in singles.

Karen Susman did not defend her title as she was expecting her first child.

Seeds

  Margaret Smith (champion)
  Lesley Turner (fourth round)
  Ann Jones (semifinals)
  Darlene Hard (semifinals)
  Jan Lehane (quarterfinals)
  Věra Suková (third round)
  Maria Bueno (quarterfinals)
  Renée Schuurman (quarterfinals)

Draw

Finals

Top half

Section 1

Section 2

Section 3

Section 4

Bottom half

Section 5

Section 6

Section 7

Section 8

References

External links

Women's Singles
Wimbledon Championship by year – Women's singles
Wimbledon Championships
Wimbledon Championships